Phoenix Lake is a census-designated place (CDP) in Tuolumne County, California. The 2010 United States census reported Phoenix Lake's population was 4,269. Phoenix lake was created a CDP for the 2010 census; previously, it was part of the Phoenix Lake-Cedar Ridge CDP.

Geography
According to the United States Census Bureau, the CDP covers an area of 11.1 square miles (28.8 km2), 98.84% of it land and 1.16% of it water.

Demographics
The 2010 United States Census reported that Phoenix Lake had a population of 4,269. The racial makeup of Phoenix Lake was 3,991 (93.5%) White, 15 (0.4%) African American, 40 (0.9%) Native American, 50 (1.2%) Asian, 3 (0.1%) Pacific Islander, 51 (1.2%) from other races, and 119 (2.8%) from two or more races. Hispanic or Latino of any race were 305 persons (7.1%).

The Census reported that 4,266 people (99.9% of the population) lived in households, 3 (0.1%) lived in non-institutionalized group quarters, and 0 (0%) were institutionalized.

There were 1,764 households, out of which 430 (24.4%) had children under the age of 18 living in them, 1,138 (64.5%) were opposite-sex married couples living together, 103 (5.8%) had a female householder with no husband present, 81 (4.6%) had a male householder with no wife present.  There were 80 (4.5%) unmarried opposite-sex partnerships, and 15 (0.9%) same-sex married couples or partnerships. 358 households (20.3%) were made up of individuals, and 215 (12.2%) had someone living alone who was 65 years of age or older. The average household size was 2.42.  There were 1,322 families (74.9% of all households); the average family size was 2.74.

The population was spread out, with 773 people (18.1%) under the age of 18, 224 people (5.2%) aged 18 to 24, 674 people (15.8%) aged 25 to 44, 1,459 people (34.2%) aged 45 to 64, and 1,139 people (26.7%) who were 65 years of age or older.  The median age was 52.9 years. For every 100 females, there were 96.5 males.  For every 100 females age 18 and over, there were 98.3 males.

The homeowner vacancy rate was 2.8%; the rental vacancy rate was 5.7%.  3,637 people (85.2% of the population) lived in owner-occupied housing units and 629 people (14.7%) lived in rental housing units.

References

Census-designated places in Tuolumne County, California
Populated places in the Sierra Nevada (United States)